Coenwulf (or Cenwulf) was a medieval Bishop of Dorchester.

Coenwulf was consecrated around 909 and died between 909 and 925.

Citations

References

External links
 

Bishops of Dorchester (Mercia)
10th-century deaths
Year of birth unknown